In bioinformatics, the Wernberg coloring, or Wernberg transformation is a way of color-coding DNA nucleotides.

Definition

The Wernberg coloring is defined as the following map:

There is currently ongoing discussion for including other potential base pairs, such as uracil, into the standard.

References

DNA